The Bedford Sixth Form is a state sixth form located in the centre of Bedford, Bedfordshire, England. It is the only institution in Bedford solely dedicated to sixth form choices. The institution offers a range of GCSEs, A-Levels and Technical Diplomas to 16- to 18-year-olds. 
The previous SPA complex is managed by Bedford College Services Ltd. trading as Trinity Arts & Leisure - a community facility consisting of a 25-metre six-lane swimming pool, gym and theatre used by local film club and acting groups.

History
The Bedford Sixth Form opened in September 2012. Part of Bedford College, the sixth form centre derives from the college's existing sixth form provision. A-Levels and Technical Diplomas were previously offered at the college's main site. In the summer of 2012, Bedford College leased the old Bedford High School site on Bromham Road, after the school had closed. The Bedford Sixth Form has operated from the site ever since. 
In March 2014, Bedford College purchased the site including the old main school buildings, Trinity Church, and the Sports and Performing Arts (SPA) complex from owners, the Harpur Trust.

Academic performance
Ofsted's 2014 inspection of Bedford College resulted in a 'good with outstanding features' rating.

In August 2014 the first students to complete a two-year programme at The Bedford Sixth Form received their A-Level results, receiving a 100% pass rate in 24 out of 30 A-Level subjects.

A-Level results for the 2017/18 academic year consisted of an aggregate 99% pass rate (in 30 subjects), with 73% of students receiving A*-C.

More recently, A-Level results during the 2019/20 academic year consisted of an aggregate 99% pass rate (in 31 subjects), with 55% of students receiving A*-B.

The Bedford Sixth Form Today 
 
As of 2022 The Bedford Sixth Form offers 37 subjects (A-Levels and Diplomas), including four modern-day languages (German, French, Spanish and Italian) as well as Latin. Thanks to the fact that The Bedford Sixth Form focuses solely on the education of 16-19 year olds and is not joint to a Secondary School, it allows for more opportunities and primarily focuses on the education and well being of Sixth Formers studying there.

Along with these 37 subjects they offer a range of extra-curricular activities which they call Enhancements; a typical student can partake in up to 6 of these enhancements over their journey at the sixth form (3 per term, over 2 academic years). These enhancements can vary from aligning directly to a students subjects to just being something of personal interest to the individual, such as Stock Markets and/or The Duke of Edinburgh’s Award (DofE)*.

As well as these Enhancements, they see work experience as 'a core part of all programmes at The Bedford Sixth Form' and allocate a week during a students programme year where students will be expected to be on a work placement for 30 hours, (placements must not be part-time jobs that students already have and we encourage our students to find work placements related to their subjects or future career path.).

In past years, The Bedford Sixth Form has taken students to multiple Trips & Talks depending on the subjects they study, for instance a tour and talk at the Houses of Parliament (London) for Government & Politics students, trips to Rome (Italy) and Athens (Greece) for Philosophy & Classical Civilisation students and a trip to New York City (USA) for Media & Film Studies students.

References

External links
 The Bedford Sixth Form
 Bedford College

Schools in Bedford
Further education colleges in Bedfordshire
Learning and Skills Beacons
Educational institutions established in 2012
2012 establishments in England